Kręcieszki  is a village in the administrative district of Gmina Bedlno, within Kutno County, Łódź Voivodeship, in central Poland.

Kręcieszki (pol. kręte, ścieżki) are located along the route of E2. The name comes from the observation that the village long ago ran along the road which was very tortuous (winding paths). Today, however, it is a simple way. The village has about 150 inhabitants. 70% of people with Kręcieszek kept out of the farm. 

In the years 1975-1998 the town to the province of Plock.

References

Villages in Kutno County